Orienantius ritteri  is an extinct genus of enantiornithine bird from the Lower Cretaceous of China.

Description 
Orienantius is known from the holotype specimen BMNHC Ph 1156a/b and the referred specimen BMNHC Ph 1154a/b. Both specimens of Orienantius come from the Huajiying Formation of Hebei Province. BMNHC Ph 1156a/b consists of a nearly complete, articulated skeleton with extensive feather impressions on a slab and counterslab. BMNHC Ph 1154a/b is also known from a nearly complete, articulated skeleton with body, wing, and tail feathers preserved in a slab and counterslab. Both individuals were estimated by the authors to be about the same size as the Eurasian Skylark. The lack of fusion in the carpometacarpus, tibiotarsus, tarsometatarsus, and other compound bones lead the authors to suggest that the holotype of Orienantius was not skeletally mature at the time of death.Fossils of Orienantius preserves extensive non-plumage soft tissues of the neck, hindlimbs. forelimbs, and viceral region, an exceptional state of preservation for fossil birds. The soft tissues of Orienantius allowed researchers to better estimate the flight capabilities of basal enantiornithines; Orienantius showed evidence that it was capable of high maneuverability and intermittent flap-gliding.

Etymology

The name Orienantius is composed of the prefix "Ori-", meaning "dawn", and the suffix "-enantius", meaning "opposite" and used here after its clade, the Enantiornithes. The species name, ritteri, honours the German scientist Johann Wilhelm Ritter.

References 

Enantiornitheans
Prehistoric bird genera
Extinct birds of Asia
Mesozoic birds of Asia
Birds described in 2019
Fossil taxa described in 2019